Beverly Jean White (née Larson; September 2, 1928May 24, 2021) was an American activist and politician who served in the Utah House of Representatives from the 57th, 64th, and 21st districts from 1971 to 1991, as a member of the Democratic Party. She was the longest-serving female member of the Utah State Legislature. White held multiple positions in the Democratic Party at the local, state, and national levels and also attended many state and national conventions.

White was born in Salt Lake City, and grew up in Tooele, Utah. She was educated at Tooele High School. She married Floyd White, who also became involved in politics. She entered politics with her involvement in the Tooele County Democratic Ladies Club and later became active in the Tooele County Democratic Party.

White served as vice-chair of the Tooele County Democratic Party, secretary of the Utah Democratic Party for sixteen years, and on the Rules Committee of the Democratic National Committee. She was a delegate to multiple state conventions of the Utah Democratic Party and as a delegate to every Democratic National Convention from 1964 to 2004, with the exception of 1976 when she was an alternate delegate.

She first held office with her appointment to the Utah Board of Pardons by Governor Cal Rampton. She was on the board until Rampton appointed her to fill a vacancy in the state house created by Representative F. Chileon Halladay's death. During her tenure in the state house she was at times the only female chair of a committee and served as Assistant Whip while in the majority and minority. She lost reelection in the 1990 election to Republican nominee Merrill Nelson. Following her tenure in the state house she served on a hospital board, wrote a book about female legislators, and aided in the creation of a satellite campus for Utah State University. She died in 2021.

Early life

Beverly Jean Larson was born in Salt Lake City, Utah, on September 2, 1928, to Helene and Gustave Larson. Her mother died when she was twelve and she was raised by her aunt Margret and uncle Dunn. She graduated from Tooele High School. In 1947, she married Floyd White, with whom she had five children, at the Salt Lake Temple. Her husband was elected to the city council and Bish White, her father-in-law, was elected as sheriff of Tooele County.

Career

Politics

White was elected as president of the Tooele County Democratic Ladies Club in 1959. She served as vice-chair of the Tooele County Democratic Party during the 1960s. She served as a delegate to the Utah Democratic Party's state convention multiple times. She served as secretary of the Utah Democratic Party for sixteen years until she was defeated by D'Arcy Dixon in 1987. White was selected to serve on the Rules Committee of the Democratic National Committee in 1972.

White attended every Democratic National Convention as a delegate from 1964 to 2004, with the exception of the 1976 Democratic National Convention. She served as a delegate to the Democratic National Convention during the 1964, 1988, 1996, and 2004 presidential elections. During the 1968 Democratic presidential primary she served as an uncommitted delegate as a part of Utah's twenty-six member delegation to the Democratic National Convention. During the 1972 presidential election she served as a delegate to the Democratic National Convention and was the secretary of the Utah delegation. During the 1976 presidential election she served as an uncommitted alternate delegate to the Democratic National Convention. During the 1980 Democratic presidential primary she served as a delegate for Senator Ted Kennedy to the Democratic National Convention. During the 1984 Democratic presidential primary she served as one of two uncommitted delegates, although she voted for Gary Hart, to the Democratic National Convention while sixteen of Utah's delegates supported Hart and nine supported Walter Mondale. During the 2000 presidential election she served as a delegate to the Democratic National Convention and was the oldest member of Utah's twenty-nine member delegation to the convention.

She was a member of the Juvenile Court Advisory Board. She was appointed by Governor Cal Rampton and approved by the Utah Senate to serve on the Utah Board of Pardons for the Utah State Prison for a six-year term becoming the first woman to serve on the board, but left early to take a seat in the Utah House of Representatives.

During the 1976 United States House of Representative election Representative Allan Turner Howe was convicted of soliciting sex. White joined other leaders in the Democratic Party in calling for a resolution to ask Howe to withdraw from the election as he would hurt the chances of other candidates and so that a replacement appointment could be made. Howe did not withdraw from the race and was defeated by Republican nominee David Daniel Marriott.

Utah House of Representatives

Elections

Representative F. Chileon Halladay, who served six terms in the Utah House of Representatives, died from bronchial pneumonia on March 4, 1971. Governor Rampton appointed White to fill the vacancy in the 57th district in the state house on March 8. She served in the state house for twenty years, making her the longest-serving female member of the Utah State Legislature.

She won reelection to the 64th district in the 1972 election against Clarence Hansen, a write-in candidate. She won reelection against Republican nominee Carolyn Palmer in the 1974 election. She won reelection without opposition in the 1976 election. She defeated Republican nominee Phyllis Dunn in the 1978 election. She defeated Republican nominee Douglas Christensen in the 1980 election.

During the 1982 election, White ran against Representative John E. Smith in the Democratic primary as both of them were moved into the 21st district by redistricting. White defeated Smith at the Tooele County Democratic Convention, winning seventy-two delegates to Smith's twenty-three, which was above the seventy percent required to prevent a primary. She defeated Smith, who ran a write-in campaign, in the general election. White faced no opposition in the 1984, 1986, and 1988 elections.

During the 1990 election White debated Republican nominee Merrill Nelson who criticized her as the "most liberal" member of the state house. She lost in the general election to Nelson who received over sixty percent of the vote. Although White lost her seat the Democratic Party increased their net amount of seats in the state house by four seats.

Tenure

During White's tenure in the state house, she served as chair of the Social Services committee and as a member of the Local Government and Consumer Affairs committees. At times, she was the only woman to serve as the chair of a committee. She served as secretary of the Tooele County Council of Governments and the Tooele County Planning Commission. White also served as treasurer of the National Order of Women Legislators.

She served as Assistant Majority Whip from 1975 to 1976, and Assistant Minority Whip from 1977 to 1978. She ran for the position of Minority Whip in 1980, but was defeated by Representative John Garr. White ran for the position of Minority Leader in 1982, but was defeated by Representative Mike Dmitrich. White ran for the position of Minority Whip in 1984, but Representative Blaze Wharton was given the position instead. In 1986, she was selected to serve on the Management Committee which was the fourth-highest position in the minority leadership.

White was appointed to serve on the Utah Health Planning Council in 1979. She received the Susa Young Gates Award in 1978. The National Association of Social Workers named her as legislator of the year in 1981. From 1986 to 1993, she served as a member of the Governor's Commission on the Status of Women. She was named the legislator of the year in 1981, as the woman of the year by the Central Women Club of Utah in 1982, and as the Democratic legislator of the year in 1987.

Later life

White served on the Tooele Valley Medical Center Special Service District Board until 1993. She was the board's chair from 1989 to 1991. White offered to resign from the position of chair in 1989, due to controversy involving debt of $50,000, but the board voted to show confidence in her. Despite not wanting to serve another term she was unanimously selected to serve another term in 1990. She declined to serve another term despite having been renominated in 1991. She was selected to serve as secretary after being chair of the board.

On January 22, 1991, White and five other people were selected by forty delegates to be candidates to replace Bill Pitt on the Tooele County Commission, but Edwin St. Clair was selected to fill the vacancy. The two Republican members of the county commission were critical of the six proposed candidates with Commissioner Teryl Hunsaker stating that the Democrats did not take the opportunity to select "clean, fresh blood to bring a new perspective into the system".

White also helped establish the Children's Justice Center in Tooele and worked for the Tooele Adult Probation and Parole Office. White was also as a member of the Governor's Commission on the Status of Women from 1986 to 1993.

White wrote Women Legislators of Utah, 1896–1993, a book about women who served in the state government. She received the Eleanor Roosevelt Award in 1994. The American Association of University Women named White as the distinguished woman of the year for 1996 to 1997. She aided in the creation of a satellite university for Utah State University in Tooele; the university later gave her an honorary doctorate degree in 2017. She aided in the election of Debbie Winn, the first female mayor of Tooele. White died in Taylorsville, Utah, on May 24, 2021.

Political positions

Abortion

During the 1970s White supported making abortion laws more restrictive. In 1977, the Utah state house voted fifty-five to five, with White against, in favor of a resolution calling for a constitutional convention to amend the Constitution of the United States to ban abortion. White opposed a section of anti-abortion legislation which would require families to see photographs of dead fetuses, saying they were "pornographic" and that anyone who would send them through the mail would be arrested. She criticized legislation passed by the state house in 1988, which required parental consent for materials that mention contraception. During the 1990 election Nelson was critical of White's pro-choice views. She served as a representative for Planned Parenthood to the World Conference on Women, 1995.

Capital punishment

The Supreme Court of the United States ruled that capital punishment was unconstitutional in Furman v. Georgia ending the usage of capital punishment in the United States until the Gregg v. Georgia ruling. White supported the restoration of capital punishment in Utah and it became the first state to resume executions in the United States.

Equal Rights Amendment

In 1973, when the Utah state house voted fifty-one to twenty against ratifying the Equal Rights Amendment, White was one of the representatives who voted in favor of the amendment. She sponsored another attempt to ratify the Equal Rights Amendment in 1975. She called for members of the state legislature to not vote on the amendment based on their religion due to the Church of Jesus Christ of Latter-day Saints' opposition to the amendment. As of 2021 Utah is one of twelve states to have not ratified the Equal Rights Amendment.

Women's rights

White and five other female members of the Utah state legislature wrote to Superintendent of Public Instruction Walter D. Talbot to investigate sex discrimination in educational hiring practices. In 1979, Representatives White, Joan R. Turner, Lucille G. Taylor, and Senator Frances Farley praised Governor Scott M. Matheson for appointing a woman, Phyllis C. Southwick, to the state house. The state house voted to abolish the Governor's Commission on the Status of Women in 1980, while White and all other female members of the state house voted against. White was endorsed for reelection in the 1990 election by the National Organization for Women.

Electoral history

References

1928 births
2021 deaths
20th-century American politicians
21st-century American politicians
Democratic Party members of the Utah House of Representatives
People from Salt Lake City